Deventer Colmschate is a railway station located in Deventer, Netherlands. The station was opened in 1888 and is located on the Deventer–Almelo railway. The train services are operated by Nederlandse Spoorwegen.

The station was closed between 15 May 1933 and 10 December 1989. Before the reopening in 1989, the station's name was simply Colmschate as Colmschate was a village back then. Some time after the closure, it was incorporated as a neighbourhood of Deventer.

In 2018, a tunnel was dug under the station by ProRail to remove the railroad crossing.

Train services

Bus services

A little bit south of the station, there's another bus stop called De Scheg, where line 6 and 160 halt.

External links
NS website 
Dutch Public Transport journey planner 

Railway stations in Overijssel
1888 establishments in the Netherlands
Railway stations opened in 1888
Railway stations closed in 1933
Railway stations opened in 1989
Buildings and structures in Deventer
Railway stations in the Netherlands opened in the 19th century